One Hundred and Two H-Bombs is a collection of science fiction stories by American writer Thomas M. Disch.  It was first published by Compact Books in 1967.  The stories originally appeared in the magazines Fantastic, Worlds of Tomorrow, Amazing Stories, If, New Worlds, Alfred Hitchcock's Mystery Magazine and Bizarre! Mystery Magazine.

Contents

 Introduction"
 "102 H-Bombs"
 "The Sightseers"
 "Final Audit"
 "The Vamp"
 "Utopia? Never!"
 "The Return of the Medusae"
 "The Princess’ Carillon"
 "Genetic Coda"
 "White Fang Goes Dingo"
 "The Demi-Urge"
 "Dangerous Flags"
 "Invaded by Love"
 "Bone of Contention"
 "Leader of the Revolution"

Sources

1967 short story collections
Short story collections by Thomas M. Disch